Jalalabad (also Romanized as Jalālābād) is a village in Kuhestan Rural District, in the Central District of Nain County, Isfahan Province, Iran. According to the 2006 census, its population was ten persons in five families.

References 

Populated places in Nain County